This Is Now!!! is the third studio album by Craig G. It was released in 2003 via D&D Records. The album's audio production was handled by the Alchemist, Arabian Knight, Caspa, Curt Cazal, Da Beatminerz, DJ Premier, DJ Sage, Domingo, Kenny Muhammad the Human Orchestra, Large Professor, Marley Marl, Nottz, Rockwilder and Will Pack, with executive production provided by David Lotwin and Douglas Grama. It featured guest appearances from Afu-Ra, Kenny Muhammad The Human Orchestra, Krumbsnatcha, Large Professor, Mr. Cheeks and Will Pack. The album debuted at number 99 on the Top R&B/Hip-Hop Albums. It spawned four singles: "Say What You Want", "Let's Get Up", "Stomped"/"Make You Say Yes", "Now That's What's Up"/"Ready Set Begin", but none of them charted.

Track listing

Personnel 

 Craig Curry – main artist
 Terrance Kelly – featured artist (track 5)
 Will Pack – featured artist & producer (track 10)
 William Paul Mitchell – featured artist & producer (track 11)
 Kenny Muhammad The Human Orchestra – featured artist & producer (track 12)
 Aaron Phillip – featured artist (track 12)
 Demetrius Gibbs – featured artist (track 14)
 Curtis Andre Small – producer (tracks: 1, 4)
 Daniel Alan Maman – producer (track 2)
 Christopher Edward Martin – producer (track 3)
 Dominick J. Lamb – producer (track 5)
 DJ Sage – producer (tracks: 6, 9)
 Dana Stinson – producer (track 7)
 Marlon Williams – producer (track 8)
 Domingo Padilla – producer (track 13)
 Da Beatminerz – producer (track 14)
 Ted Hogan – producer (track 15)
 Suleyman Ansari – producer (track 16)
 David Lotwin – executive producer
 Douglas Grama – executive producer, recording (tracks: 2, 7, 13)
 Eric Steinen – recording (tracks: 1, 5, 7, 13)
 Kieran Walsh – recording (tracks: 2, 3, 8, 9, 11, 12, 14, 16), mixing (tracks: 1, 2, 4, 5, 8, 9, 11-14, 16)
 Dejuana Richardson – recording (tracks: 4, 15), mixing (track 15)
 Dexter Thibou – mixing (track 3)
 Pat Viala – mixing (track 7)
 Tony Dawsey – mastering
 Steve Hervatic – design
 Michael Schreiber – photography

Charts

References

External links 

2003 albums
Craig G albums
Albums produced by Da Beatminerz
Albums produced by DJ Premier
Albums produced by Domingo (producer)
Albums produced by Large Professor
Albums produced by Marley Marl
Albums produced by Nottz
Albums produced by Rockwilder
Albums produced by the Alchemist (musician)